Chiricahua Peak is the name of a  peak located in the Chiricahua Mountains of southeastern Arizona, located about  north of the United States–Mexico border. It is the highest summit in the Chiricahua Mountains and the highest point in Cochise County.

As with the rest of the Chiricahua Mountains, the peak was formed as the result of a violent volcanic eruption about 27 million years ago.

The peak contains one of the southernmost Engelmann spruce stands in the world. There are also extensive stands of aspen on the north slope. Much of the peak was severely burned in recent times, which creates vast open views across the landscape. This includes views across the Basin and Range to Mount Lemmon, Mount Graham, and Mount Wrightson. In addition, Willcox Playa is visible in the basin below.

In 2011 the Horseshoe 2 Fire burned a total of  within the Chiricahua Mountains causing considerable damage to the trail system.


See also
 Chiricahua National Monument
 List of Ultras of the United States
 Coronado National Forest

References

External links
 

Chiricahua Mountains
Landforms of Cochise County, Arizona
Mountains of Arizona
Coronado National Forest
Mountains of Cochise County, Arizona